The 1934 Akron Zippers football team was an American football team that represented the University of Akron in the Ohio Athletic Conference during the 1934 college football season. In its eighth season under head coach Red Blair, the team compiled a 3–4–1 record (3–4 in conference) and outscored opponents by a total of 65 to 48. Don Lindsay was the team captain.

Schedule

References

Akron
Akron Zips football seasons
Akron Zippers football